
Calypso is a moon of Saturn. It was discovered in 1980, from ground-based observations, by Dan Pascu, P. Kenneth Seidelmann, William A. Baum, and Douglas G. Currie, and was provisionally designated  (the 25th satellite of Saturn discovered in 1980). In 1983 it was officially named after Calypso of Greek mythology. It is also designated  or Tethys C.

Calypso is co-orbital with the moon Tethys, and resides in Tethys' trailing Lagrangian point, 60 degrees behind Tethys. This relationship was first identified by Seidelmann et al. in 1981. The moon Telesto resides in the other (leading) Lagrangian point of Tethys, 60 degrees in the other direction from Tethys. Calypso and Telesto have been termed "Tethys trojans", by analogy to the trojan asteroids, and are half of the four presently known trojan moons.

Like many other small Saturnian moons and small asteroids, Calypso is irregularly shaped, has overlapping large craters, and appears to also have loose surface material capable of smoothing the craters' appearance. Its surface is one of the most reflective (at visual wavelengths) in the Solar System, with a visual geometric albedo of 1.34. This very high albedo is the result of the sandblasting of particles from Saturn's E-ring, a faint ring composed of small, water-ice particles generated by Enceladus' south polar geysers.

Gallery

See also 

 List of natural satellites

References 

Notes

Citations

Sources

 
 
 
 
 
 
 
 
  (supporting online material, table S1)

External links 

 Calypso Profile by NASA's Solar System Exploration
 The Planetary Society: Calypso
 Animation of photos from Cassini 2010-02-13 flyby on YouTube
 Raw images

19800313
Moons of Saturn
Trojan moons
Calypso (mythology)
Moons with a prograde orbit